The following lists events that happened during 1915 in New Zealand.

World War I and New Zealand's participation in it dominate the year. Most notably, New Zealand troops take part in the landings at ANZAC cove, Gallipoli on 25 April, and the ensuing campaign.

The various political parties agree to form a wartime coalition in August, even though the Reform Party has an absolute majority in parliament.

Many sporting events are put on hold for the duration of the war, due to the number of men serving in the armed forces and the drive to conserve resources for the war effort.

Incumbents

Regal and viceregal
 Head of State – George V
 Governor – Arthur Foljambe, 2nd Earl of Liverpool

Government
The 19th New Zealand Parliament commenced, initially with the Reform Party in power, but in August a wartime coalition government was formed, with Liberal party leader Joseph Ward becoming finance minister.
Speaker of the House – Frederic Lang (Reform Party)
Prime Minister – William Massey (Reform Party)
Minister of Finance – James Allen until 12 August, then Joseph Ward

Parliamentary opposition
 Leader of the Opposition – Joseph Ward (Liberal Party). Ward retained the title even though he became part of the coalition government.

Judiciary
Chief Justice – Sir Robert Stout

Main centre leaders
Mayor of Auckland – James Parr then James Gunson
Mayor of Wellington – John Luke
Mayor of Christchurch – Henry Holland
Mayor of Dunedin – John Shacklock then James Clark

Events 

 1 January – First flight of the Walsh Brothers' Curtiss-type flying boat. The flight takes place at Bastion Point and it is the first such aircraft built and flown in the Southern Hemisphere.
 14 February – The first contingent of 500 Māori soldiers sails for Egypt aboard SS Warrimoo. Earlier policy had been against 'native peoples' fighting in a European war.
 25 April – New Zealand troops participate in the landings at Gallipoli.
 23 October – Sinking of SS Marquette with 32 New Zealand deaths; mainly nurses and medical staff
 October – The New Zealand Flying School is started by the Walsh Brothers at Ōrākei. Its primary purpose is to train pilots for the Royal Flying Corps.
 November – The New Zealand Flying School moves to Kohimarama.
 20 December – The last New Zealand troops are evacuated from Gallipoli.

Undated
The Waikato Argus, established in 1896, merges into the Waikato Times.

Arts and literature
See 1915 in art, 1915 in literature, :Category:1915 books

Music
See: 1915 in music

Film
See: :Category:1915 film awards, 1915 in film, List of New Zealand feature films, Cinema of New Zealand, :Category:1915 films

Sport

Chess
 The 28th New Zealand Chess Championship is held in Christchurch, and is won by Fedor Kelling of Wellington, his second title.

Golf
 The New Zealand Open championship and National Amateur Championships are not held due to the war.

Horse racing

Harness racing
 New Zealand Trotting Cup – Country Belle
 Auckland Trotting Cup – Cathedral Chimes

Thoroughbred racing
 New Zealand Cup – Tangihou
 Auckland Cup – Balboa
 Wellington Cup – Pavlova
 New Zealand Derby – Desert Gold

Lawn bowls
The national outdoor lawn bowls championships are held in Auckland.
 Men's singles champion – M. Walker (Ponsonby Bowling Club)
 Men's pair champions – G.A. Blackwood, A. Smellie (skip) (Green Island Bowling Club)
 Men's fours champions – N.H. Nash, S. Dixon, F.J. Tasker, J.A. Nash (skip) (Palmerston North Bowling Club)

Rugby union
 The Ranfurly Shield (held by Wellington) is not contested as interprovincial matches are cancelled due to the war.

Soccer
 Provincial league champions:
 Auckland – Brotherhood
 Canterbury – Christchurch Club
 Hawke's Bay – Waipukurau
 Otago – HSOB
 Southland – No competition
 Wanganui – No competition
 Wellington – Wellington Thistle

Births

January–March
 3 January – Robert Hurst, nuclear chemist
 7 January – Mary Martin, netball player
 22 January
 Tom Burtt, cricketer and field hockey player
 Mona Leydon, swimmer
 13 February – Raniera Ellison, fishing company manager
 15 February – Jimmy James, dancer, dance teacher and cabaret proprietor
 22 February
 James Pirret, lawn bowler
 John Scandrett, cricketer
 2 March – Bill Crawford-Crompton, air force pilot and commander
 11 March – Amelia Batistich, writer
 22 March – Fen Cresswell, cricketer
 23 March – Cecil Devine, standardbred racehorse driver
 28 March – Ray Emery, cricketer

April–June
 3 April – Philip Blakeley, electrical engineer and engineering administrator
 14 April – Leonard Trent, air force pilot, Victoria Cross recipient
 22 April – Geoff Moon, naturalist, photographer and veterinarian
 30 April – Helen Mason, potter
 5 May – Snow Bowman, rugby union player
 19 May – Wal Chisholm, athletics coach
 25 May – James Austin, meteorology academic
 26 May – Terence Vaughan, pianist, conductor, composer and performing arts administrator
 27 May – Alan McKenzie, disabled artist, entertainer
 2 June – Jim Newhook, veterinary science academic
 3 June – Jack Lewin, public servant and unionist
 4 June – Walter Hadlee, cricketer and cricket administrator
 10 June – Inia Te Wiata, opera singer, actor, carver and artist
 27 June – Graham Botting, cricketer
 30 June – Gordon Rowe, cricketer and cricket umpire

July–September
 10 July – Jack Parker, boxer
 29 July – Tristan Hegglun, rower, rugby union player, politician
 31 July – Theo Schoon, artist, photographer and carver
 3 August – Harold Tyrie, athlete and athletics coach
 8 August – John Kennedy-Good, politician and dentist
 11 August – Jack Skinner, association football player
 18 August – Fred Lucas, air force and commercial pilot, tourism operator
 21 August – Lena Manuel, community leader
 1 September – Allan Dick, politician
 4 September – Ethel Divers, netball player
 5 September – Peter Tait, politician
 15 September – Jimmy Ell, cricketer
 19 September – Ron Moore, soldier
 23 September – Has Catley, rugby union player

October–December
 1 October – Jim Davidson, historian
 9 October – John Rodgers, Roman Catholic bishop
 22 October – Pat Twohill, actor and radio announcer
 26 October – Sydney Goodsir Smith, poet, artist, dramatist and novelist
 31 October – Muriel Boswell, netball player
 1 November – Harry Lapwood, soldier and politician
 2 November – Douglas Lilburn, composer
 5 November – Toby Hill, watersider and trade unionist
 9 November – Florence Humphries, trade unionist and consumer advocate
 10 November – Duncan MacIntyre, soldier and politician
 11 November – Ben Gascoigne, astronomer
 14 November – David Thomson, soldier and politician
 30 November – Peter Hanan, swimmer
 6 December – Alan Sayers, athlete, journalist and writer
 10 December – Nicky Barr, rugby union player and World War II fighter ace
 15 December – Joy Lamason, cricketer
 17 December – Philip Adams, diplomat
 22 December – Dorothy Neal White, librarian

Deaths

January–March
 15 January – William Shepherd Allen, politician (born 1831)
 26 January – Frank Lethbridge, politician (born 1852)
 25 February – Ann Alabaster, schoolteacher (born 1842)
 26 February – Edward Richardson, engineer, politician (born 1830)
 1 March – Francis Arkwright, politician (born 1846)
 13 March – George Parker, politician (born 1839)
 15 March – John Grimes, Roman Catholic bishop (born 1842)
 23 March – John Bollard, politician (born 1839)
 31 March – Allan Marshall, river captain and engineer (born 1851)

April–June
 6 April – Felix McGuire, politician (born 1847)
 18 April – Francis St Omer, baker, restaurateur, politician (born 1827)
 25 April
 George Chamier, novelist (born 1842)
 Nat Williams, cricketer (born 1878)
 27 April – William Rhodes-Moorhouse, pilot, Victoria Cross recipient (born 1887)
 7 May – James Livingston, soldier, community leader (born 1840)
 8 May – Charles Savory, rugby league player, boxer (born 1889)
 9 May – Anthony Wilding, tennis player (born 1883)
 17 May – Alexander McNeill, politician (born 1833)
 21 May – William Henry Skinner, architect (born 1838)
 2 June – Te Hapimana Tauke, Ngāti Ruanui leader, mission teacher, historian (born 1810)
 6 June – Edward Cephas John Stevens, land agent, cricketer, politician (born 1837)
 11 June – James Williams, runholder, orchardist (born 1837)

July–September
 15 July – Wiremu Kerei Nikora, politician (born 1853)
 30 July – William Burn, military pilot (born 1891)
 8 August – William Malone, soldier (born 1859)
 9 August – Norman Hastings, soldier (born 1879)
 11 August – Alfred Shout, soldier, Victoria Cross recipient (born 1882)
 20 August – George Beetham, politician, alpinist (born 1840)
 2 September – Richard Twopeny, journalist, newspaper editor (born 1857)
 11 September – John McLachlan, politician (born 1840)
 25 September – Hugh Butterworth, cricketer, schoolteacher (born 1885)

October–December
 8 October – Thomas Cawthron, businessman, philanthropist (born 1833)
 14 October – John Duthie, politician, mayor of Wellington (1889–90) (born 1841)
 15 October – John A. Millar, politician (born 1855)
 27 October – Leonard Harper, politician (born 1832)
 29 October – Mrs Chippy, cat
 3 November – Thomas Kempthorne, manufacturing chemist, philanthropist (born 1834)
 12 November – James Ogilvie-Grant, 11th Earl of Seafield, nobleman (born 1876)
 13 November – Alfred Dillon, politician (born 1841)
 9 December – Wi Pere, politician (born 1837)
 13 December – David Boyle, 7th Earl of Glasgow, Governor of New Zealand (1892–97) (born 1833)
 15 December – William Crawford, brewer, politician, photographer (born 1844)
 18 December – Matilda Lo Keong, storekeeper, first known Chinese female immigrant to New Zealand (born 1855)
 22 December – Sir Joshua Williams, politician, jurist (born 1837)
 27 December – Charles Christie Graham, politician (born 1835)
 29 December – Frank Buckland, politician (born 1847)

See also
History of New Zealand
List of years in New Zealand
Military history of New Zealand
Timeline of New Zealand history
Timeline of New Zealand's links with Antarctica
Timeline of the New Zealand environment

References

External links